Chalmazel-Jeansagnière (in arpitan : Vers-Charmasél-Genceniéres, pronunciation : [ve.ʃam.ˈze.ʒɑ̃sa.ˈneʁ]) is a commune in the Loire department of central France. The municipality was established on 1 January 2016 and consists of the former communes of Chalmazel and Jeansagnière.

See also 
Communes of the Loire department

References 

Communes of Loire (department)